An ice cream cake is a cake with ice cream as the filling for a swiss roll or a layer cake. A simpler no-bake version can be made by layering different flavors of ice cream in a loaf pan.

Ice cream cake is a popular party food, often eaten at birthdays and weddings, particularly in North America and Australia. It is not as well known in Europe. In the UK ice cream swiss roll cakes are known as Arctic rolls.

Preparation
In a typical assembly, the cake component is baked in the normal way, cut to shape if necessary, and then frozen. Ice cream is shaped in a mold as appropriate, and these components are then assembled while frozen. Whipped cream is often used for frosting, as a complement to the two other textures, and because many typical frostings will not adhere successfully to frozen cake. The whole cake is then kept frozen until serving, when it is allowed to thaw until it can be easily sliced but not so much as to melt the ice cream.

U.S. market
Ice cream cakes are popular in the U.S. Carvel has a history of themed cakes advertised on television including Fudgie the Whale and Cookie Puss. Baskin-Robbins, Dairy Queen, Friendly's, Cold Stone Creamery, and other retailers also sell ice cream cakes. 

They are also a popular dessert for Fourth of July celebrations; cakes prepared for this day are often decorated with patriotic motifs, and garnished with whipped cream, red berries and blueberries. Other versions are elaborate flag cakes made with alternating layers of ice cream and sorbet.

See also
 Baked Alaska
 Bombe glacée

References

Further reading
 Stewart, Martha; (2007). Everyday Food. MarthaStewart.com.
 Johnson, Ann. (2008). About Ice Cream Cake. EHow. Demand Media
 Dean, Sydney. (2010) Ice Cream Cake Powerpoint. Upload & Share PowerPoint Presentations and Documents.
 Bejin, Samantha (2013) Lets party. Penguin books

External links
 
Icecream Cake Recipe At Home | Easy Method
Frozen Food Age Magazine

Ice cream
Frozen desserts
Australian cuisine
Victorian cuisine
No bake cakes
American cakes
Independence Day (United States) foods